Mutso is a small village in Georgia. One of the former strongholds of the historic Georgian province of Khevsureti (now part of Mtskheta-Mtianeti region), it is located on a rocky mountain (1880 m) on the right bank of the Andakistskali river (ანდაქისწყალი).

Geography

The village, almost completely abandoned more than a century ago, is a home to approximately 30 medieval fortified dwelling units arranged on vertical terraces above the Mutso-Ardoti gorge, four combat towers and ruins of several old structures and buildings. Difficult to access, the village retains original architecture, and is a popular destination for tourists and mountain trekkers. Listed, however, among the most endangered historic monuments of Georgia, a project of the rehabilitation of Mutso has been developed since 2004. In 2019, the reconstructed village won the EU Prize for Cultural Heritage / Europa Nostra Award.

Legends

A legend has it that the villagers worshiped the Broliskalo Icon of Archangel. They were renowned as fighters and hunters, and considered themselves permanent members of the army of the sacred flags and guardians of fabulous treasury donated to the Icon over the centuries. The legends say the treasury that is still kept in the high mountains around Mutso waiting for the chosen one to come.

As the legend puts it “the Shetekauris dug Mutso”, which indirectly indicates that the family founded the village or the family history started together with the founding of Mutso.

See also
Vainakh tower architecture
Mtskheta-Mtianeti
Shatili
Khone
Shetekauri
Dargavs

Readings 
Shorena Kurtsikidze & Vakhtang Chikovani, Ethnography and Folklore of the Georgia-Chechnya Border: Images, Customs, Myths & Folk Tales of the Peripheries, Munich: Lincom Europa, 2008.

References

External links 

 Georgian House: Mutso project
 The article also incorporates a translation of original Georgian text found at Expedition in Khevsureti
Images from the Georgia-Chechnya Border, 1970-1980: Visual Anthropology of the Peripheries(https://web.archive.org/web/20100108081501/http://hearstmuseum.berkeley.edu/exhibitions/photo2/photo2_splash.html)
 
Villages in Mtskheta-Mtianeti
Castles and forts in Georgia (country)
Buildings and structures in Mtskheta-Mtianeti